Ombrée d'Anjou is a commune in the Maine-et-Loire department of western France. The municipality was established on 15 December 2016 and consists of the former communes of La Chapelle-Hullin, Chazé-Henry, Combrée, Grugé-l'Hôpital, Noëllet, Pouancé, La Prévière, Saint-Michel-et-Chanveaux, Le Tremblay and Vergonnes.

Population
The population data given in the table below refer to the commune in its geography as of January 2020.

See also 
Communes of the Maine-et-Loire department

References 

Communes of Maine-et-Loire
Anjou